Road to Fame is a 2008 Mexican comedy film directed by Issa López.

Cast 
 Patricia Llaca - Eva
 Julio Bracho - Alejandro
 Maya Zapata - Francisca
 Ana Layevska - Ximena
 Daniela Schmidt - Yesenia
 Diana Garcia - Catalina
 Mónica Huarte - Karen Trigo
 Darío T. Pie - Jurado
 Daniel Figueroa - Jonathan Armando
 Ianis Guerrero - Osiris
 Gustavo Sánchez Parra - Satán
 Uriel del Toro - Conductor
 Pedro Izquierdo - Adrián
 Adrián Alonso - Patricks

References

External links 

2008 comedy films
2008 films
Mexican comedy films
2000s Mexican films
2000s Spanish-language films